Dorothy Gruening née Smith (1888–1979) was known for her social activism. Specifically, she was the general secretary of the Salem, Massachusetts Young Women's Association, and was active in the Women's International League for Peace and Freedom.

She was a graduate of Vassar College. In 1914 she married the journalist, Ernest Gruening, who became the Governor of the Alaska Territory from 1939 until 1953, and a United States Senator from Alaska from 1959 until 1969.

References

American pacifists
Women's International League for Peace and Freedom people
1888 births 
1979 deaths
Vassar College alumni